Vincenzo Maenza (born 2 May 1962) is an Italian Greco-Roman wrestler. He won two gold medals and a silver medal at the 1984, 1988, and 1992 Olympic Games.

Career
Nicknamed "Pollicino" (Thumbelin) for his small size, Vincenzo Maenza is considered the best wrestler in the Italian history. In fact, he is the first and only Italian wrestler who has won three Olympic medals, and he was also the first and only who was able to win two gold medals.

When was a child, Vincenzo weighed only 60 lbs and was affected by scoliosis. He started to wrestle at 12 years old at the CISA AUDAX wrestling club in Faenza.

He began to compete in 1976. Soon he became National Champion several times and in 1979 won the silver medal at the Mediterranean Games in Split. The next year he competed in the Summer Olympics in Moscow and placed 7th.
After he won the bronze medal at Junior European Championship and the gold medal at the Junior World Championship, in 1984 Vincenzo became Olympic champion for the first time at the 1984 Summer Olympics in Los Angeles. In the final, he defeated German wrestler Markus Scherer in 1:59 with an awesome 12-0 score.

The 1987 was a golden year for the Italian wrestler. He became European Champion and silver medalist at World Championship. A year later, at the 1988 Summer Olympics in Seoul, Vincenzo won the gold medal for the second time, after defeated the strong Bulgarian wrestler Bratan Tsenov in the semifinal match and Andrzej Głąb of Poland in the final match. In 1992, at the 1992 Summer Olympics in Barcelona, he arrived at the final match and won the silver medal, after was defeated by the Soviet wrestler Oleg Kutscherenko, who was ten years younger than he.

At the end of his career, Vincenzo Maenza's awards included: 3 Olympic Medals (two golds and one silver), 1 time European champion and 2 times bronze medalist, 1 time silver medalist and 2 times bronze medalist at the World Championships, 2 times gold medalist and 1 time bronze medalist at the Mediterranean Games.
 
In 2005, Vincenzo Maenza was inducted in the FILA International Wrestling Hall Of Fame.

Today, Vincenzo lives in Faenza with his family.

Athletic achievements
 1978 - 2nd at MEC Tournament in the Netherlands
 1979 - Mediterranean Games (Split) silver medalist
 1981 - European Championship (Bursa) bronze medalist
 1982 - World Championship (Caracas) gold medalist
 1983 - Mediterranean Games (Casablanca) gold medalist
 1984 - Summer Olympic Games (Los Angeles) gold medalist 
 1984 - 1st at CEE Athens Cup
 1984 - European Championship (Sweden) bronze medalist
 1985 - World Super Championship (Tokyo) gold medalist
 1986 - European Championship (Athens) bronze medalist
 1987 - European Championship (Tampere) gold medalist
 1987 - Mediterranean Games (Syria) gold medalist
 1987 - World Championship (France) silver medalist
 1988 - Summer Olympic Games (Seoul) gold medalist
 1989 - 2nd at World Festival (Colorado)
 1991 - Mediterranean Games bronze medalist
 1992 - Summer Olympic Games (Barcelona) silver medalist
Medal of Honor and Sport Merit

Quotes
He said about wrestling:

Trivia
 Vincenzo loves music; his favourite singers are Edoardo Bennato and Barbra Streisand.
 He likes Sylvester Stallone's films.
 His favourite football team is Juventus F.C.
 He likes to read comic books.

External links
 
 Profile in the FILA International Wrestling Hall of Fame

1962 births
Living people
People from Imola
Italian male sport wrestlers
Olympic wrestlers of Italy
Wrestlers at the 1980 Summer Olympics
Wrestlers at the 1984 Summer Olympics
Wrestlers at the 1988 Summer Olympics
Wrestlers at the 1992 Summer Olympics
Olympic gold medalists for Italy
Olympic silver medalists for Italy
Olympic medalists in wrestling
Medalists at the 1984 Summer Olympics
Medalists at the 1988 Summer Olympics
Medalists at the 1992 Summer Olympics
European Wrestling Championships medalists
World Wrestling Championships medalists
Sportspeople from the Metropolitan City of Bologna